Pine Level is a census-designated place and unincorporated community in Autauga County, Alabama, north of Prattville and west of Deatsville. As of the 2010 census, its population was 4,183. Pine Level is home to Pine Level Elementary School and  Marbury High School, part of the Autauga County School System.

The community is located along U.S. Route 31, 18 mi (29 km) northwest of Montgomery and 77 mi (124 km) south of Birmingham, both via I-65.

Demographics

References

Census-designated places in Autauga County, Alabama
Census-designated places in Alabama